Rosendals Trädgård is a garden open to the public situated on Djurgården, west of Rosendal Palace, in the central part of Stockholm, Sweden. Today, Rosendals Trädgård is open to public visitors in order to let visitors experience nature and to demonstrate different cultural effects on gardening through history. The purpose is to practise biodynamic agriculture and pedagogical education. The garden is owned and operated by the trust fund "Rosendals Trädgårds Stiftelse". 
In the area known as Rosendals Trädgård there are also, except from the garden: "Plantboden", a gardening shop where the customers can find everything that's useful in a garden, "Trädgårdsbutik", a shop where the customers can buy fresh vegetables cultivated in the garden at Rosendal. The maybe most visited shop is the famous bakery, which carries the same name as the garden, "Rosendal Trädgårds bakery". Visiting Rosendals Trädgård, one has a great opportunity to experience locally cultivated and produced phenomena and items.

History

The area today known as Rosendals Trädgård was in 1817 sold to the Swedish king Karl XIV Johan (Charles XIV John of Sweden), also known as Jean Baptiste Bernadotte. Bernadotte transformed the area into an English park. In 1819, the architect Fredrik Blom constructed a royal castle linked to the area known as "Rosendals Trädgård". At the same time a winter garden was also built, creating an opportunity to cultivate tropical plants even during wintertime. In 1848 the Swedish king Oscar I built an orangery, where exotic plants such as palms could be explored. The one person that has been most influential in the development of Rosendals Trädgård is probably Queen Josefina. Queen Josefina had a great interest in gardening and made it possible for the development to take place by establishing a number of plantations and greenhouses. In 1861, Queen Josefina also collaborated with the Swedish Gardening Society, something that made it possible to start a gardening-academy in the area. Together they reformed and structured the garden and its administration after their ideal, the Royal Horticultural Society in London. All the work that was implemented during Queen Josefina's lifetime led to a development that made Rosendals Trädgård flourish. During the fifty years that the garden academy was up running, the garden begun its transformation towards its current structure. Though, when the Garden academy was closed and the Swedish Garden Society ended their activity in the area, Rosendal went into a period of less activity. The Royal administration of Djurgården, who now owned the garden, demised the area for private practise and the garden transformed to several horticultural business garden. But in the late 1960s the Royal Administration of Djurgården acceded Rosendals Trädgård and restored it into its former glory of Queen Josefina.

The Garden and its flora

The Fruit Garden
The fruit garden has, during the development of Rosendals Trädgård, been one of the most famous parts of the garden. Every autumn, the many different kind of apple-sorts that are represented in the almost hundred trees, becomes mature. During the Swedish Garden Society's days of glory, there were nearly 400 apple-trees in the fruit garden. During this time, Rosendals fruit garden had a big importance on the spread of fruit-trees in Sweden, since the Garden academy portioned out free plants to farmers etc. Over 24 500 fruit trees, 30 000 currant bushes, as well as 22 000 park trees was portioned out all over Sweden, something that made a greater spread of the many different apple-sorts that exist in Scandinavia possible. Other fruits, such as cherries, prunes, pears etc. are also cultivated in the fruit-garden. In Lars Krantz's book, "Rosendals Trädgård", the author (a former gardener in Rosendals Trädgård) describes the yearly-reappearing apple exhibition in Rosendals Trädgård, where almost 250-300 different apple-sorts is represented: all of them cultivated in Sweden.

The Rose Garden
The rose garden was found in 1988 and today over 100 different species are cultivated there. The rose garden is situated on a slope just beside the old orangery and is perfect for cultivating roses. Due to the harsh rose climate in Sweden Rosendals Trädgård mostly cultivate bush roses which have favourable properties, such as hardiness.

Roses cultivated in the garden

Rosa alba 
Mme Legras de St Germain 
Madame Plantier 
Princesse de Lamballe 
Maxima 
Felicité Parmentier 
Rosa 'Great Maiden's Blush' 
Céleste 
Minette 
Amelia 
Königin von Dänemark 
Suaveolens 
Gudhem 

Rosa bourbonica 
Honorine de Brabant 
Souvenir de la Malmaison 
Wrams Gunnarstorp 
Coupe d' Hébé 
Mme Isaac de Pereire 
Champion of the World 
Bourbon Queen 
Louise Odier 
Gruss an Teplitz 
Ferdinand Pichard 
Adam Messerich 
Gros chou d'Hollande 

Rosa centifolia 
Cristata 
Variegata 
Fantin Latour 
Major 
Parvifolia 
Tour de Malakoff 

Rosa centifolia muscosa 
Comtesse de Murinais 
Salet 
Jeanne de Montfort 
Henri Martin 
Communis 
Baron de Wassenaer 
William Lobb 
Captaine John Ingram 
Blue Boy 
Nuits de Young 
Rubra 

Rosa gallica 
Complicata 
Duchesse de Montebello 
Comtesse de Lacépède 
Rosa Mundi 
Duchesse de Verneuil 
Officinalis 
Duc de Guiche 
Cardinal de Richelieu 
Rose du Maite d'Ecole 
Charles de Mills 
Belle de Crécy 
Tuscany 
Scharlachglut 
Alain Blanchard 
Camaieux 
Violacea 
Aimable Amie 
Jenny Duval 
Agathe Incarnata 
Duchesse d'Angoulême 

Rosa × damascena 
Trigintipetala 
York and Lancaster 
Celsiana 
St Nicholas 
Ispahan 
La ville de Bruxelles 
Mme Hardy 
Blush Damask 
Hebe's Lip 

Rosa damascea bifera 
Duchesse de Rohan 
Rose des Quatre Saisons 
Rose de Provins 
Rose de Rescht 

Rosa moschata 
Felicia 
Francesca 

Rosa portlandica 
The Portland Rose 
Arthur de Sansa 
Jacques Cartier 
Comte de Chambord 
Mme Boll 

Rosa pimpinellifolia 
Stanwell Perpetual 
Poppius 
Flore plena 
Karl Förster 
Aicha 
Frühlingsduft 

Rosa chinensis 
Old Blush 

Vres Roses 
Schneezwerg 
Thérèse Bugnet 
Jens Munk 
Martin Frobisher 
Souvenir de Philémon Cochet 

Fracofurtana Roses 
Frankfurt 

Remontant Roses (hybrida bifera) 
Souvenir de Alphonse Lavallée 
Archiduchesse Elizabeth d´Autriche 

Various Origin
Forsby Herrgård 
Clair Martin 
Prairie Dawn 
Geschwinds Nordlandrose 
Rosa sancta 

Climbing Roses 
Seagull 
Tausendschön 
Mme Gregoire Stachelin 
Rosa Longicuspis 
White Dorothy 
Dorothy Perkins 
Ilse Krohn Superior 
Rosa multiflora - Japanese climbing rose 
Rosa arvensis – Splenden

The Wine Garden
Due to Rosendals far stretching biodynamic ideals, the wine production does of course also follows the same system of biodynamic cultivation, and the wine that is produced is called biodynamic wine. The production does not include any chemical additives, only the heat from the sun and nourishment from the earth. Today 7 different grapes are cultivated. All of them are planted around the orangery and most of the vines come from Baltic.

The Trust Fund of Rosendals Trädgård
Since 1982 the Rosendals Trädgård has been operated and administrated by the trust fund of Rosendals Trädgård. The trust fund has no private economic stakeholders or interest of making profit. The only economic interest of the trust fund is to make sure that the economic return from the shops, bakery and plant house cover wages as well as house and machine maintenance. The trust fund is completely self-supporting and receives no economic contribution from the municipality.

References
 Rosendals Trädgård: Rosendals Trädgård
 Krantz, Lars & Ericsson, Nina. "Rosendals Trädgård", Tidens Förlag, Stockholm, 1993

Parks in Stockholm
Rose gardens